Arinbjarnarkviða is a skaldic poem by Egill Skalla-Grímsson in praise of his friend Arinbjörn. The poem is preserved in Möðruvallabók but not in other manuscripts of Egils saga. Some lines are lost while others may be corrupted. The metre is kviðuháttr.

References

 Arinbjarnarkviða Old Norse text from heimskringla.no
 Two editions of the original
 An English translation

Skaldic poems